Carrie Sheffield is an American columnist, broadcaster and policy analyst. Formerly a reporter for Politico and The Hill, she is author of a forthcoming memoir from Hachette Book Group.

Early life
Sheffield is from a multigenerational Mormon family but formally left the LDS Church in 2010. She was subsequently baptized in the Episcopal Church under the spiritual guidance of Presiding Bishop Michael Curry. Sheffield earned a B.A. in communications from Brigham Young University in 2005 and a master's degree in public policy from Harvard University.

Career
Sheffield formerly worked for syndicated columnist Robert Novak before joining the editorial board of The Washington Times under Tony Blankley, writing editorials on domestic and foreign policy and politics. She covered the 2008 presidential race, including an interview with former U.S. president Jimmy Carter at the Democratic National Convention in Denver, during which he stated that former president Bill Clinton had damaged Hillary Clinton's presidential campaign. 
 
Sheffield has defended the Tea Party movement, writing in USA Today: "While a few strident Tea Partiers are guilty of fanaticism, the overwhelming majority of these activists are motivated by a kernel of truth in their worries that federal spending as a share of the national economy has risen under President Obama (to the highest it has been since 1946) and would have escalated further under a Democratic Congress. History is replete with examples, from the former Soviet Union to East Germany, China, Cuba, North Korea, etc., that illustrate Tea Partiers' legitimate fears. When government encroaches on commercial liberties, the end result is a failed civil state. Economic and civil liberties go hand in hand."

Sheffield researched economic policy for Edward Conard, an American Enterprise Institute scholar and founding partner of Bain Capital. She spoke at the U.S. Senate alongside key senators in favor of landmark tax reforms passed by Congress in 2017.

Television

Sheffield has provided guest political analysis for national television networks, including Fox News, Fox Business CNN and MSNBC. She interviewed then-House Speaker Paul Ryan about conservative approaches to combating poverty during programming on the mainstage of the 2016 Conservative Political Action Conference airing live on C-SPAN. She encouraged 2018 midterm voter turnout for ABC News  and has been a featured guest on HBO’s “Real Time with Bill Maher,”  and PBS's The McLaughlin Group

Sheffield made numerous appearances on CNN following the June 2022 SCOTUS decision to reverse Roe v. Wade. following the June 2022 SCOTUS decision to reverse Roe v. Wade.

Other commentary

Sheffield contributed to Forbes magazine covering political economy. Citing prominent African-American economist Thomas Sowell with Stanford University’s Hoover Institution, she investigated analysis from Sowell and other experts on what they describe as the racist historical origins of minimum wage.

At the Conservative Political Action Conference in 2016, Sheffield said she believes conservative approaches to poverty alleviation using private and faith-based charity were more effective than government interventions because they enabled more comprehensive social and emotional development.

In commentary for "Good Morning America" with ABC News, Sheffield stated that she believes true diversity includes diversity of political ideology among voices within the national media. 
"Conservative voices are being drowned out," she said. "And we're not having a seat at the table in the national media."
Sheffield added that she is "passionate about having balance and having all voices at the table."

Entrepreneurship
In 2015, Sheffield founded Bold, a digital news network  described by The Wall Street Journal as a media startup "inspiring millennials to find their voices amid a new digital landscape." In 2018, Entrepreneur magazine ran a podcast feature about Bold's “exceedingly rare” trademark victory  over a digital news network announced by the multi-billion dollar media and entertainment companies MGM and TEGNA.

Awards

In 2006, Sheffield completed a Fulbright fellowship in Berlin studying German politics, economics, media, history and culture.

In 2009, Sheffield won funding from Harvard University to serve as a correspondent for The Jerusalem Post in Israel.

In 2015, Sheffield was named the Warren Brookes Journalism Fellow by the Competitive Enterprise Institute

In 2018, Sheffield was named a winner of the William F. Buckley Awards by America’s Future Foundation, and named a Most Inspiring New Yorker by the popular social tech app Bumble.

In 2019, Sheffield was listed in Maverick PAC's “Future 40” class of influential young conservatives.

In 2021, Sheffield was awarded the Tony Blankley Fellowship for Public Policy and American Exceptionalism by The Steamboat Institute.

Personal life

Sheffield is the niece of beauty queen Charlotte Sheffield, former Miss USA. She traveled to every continent, including Antarctica, before turning age 30. Sheffield won the National Press Club 5K race among female members of The National Press Club in 2006, 2007, and 2013.

References

External links

1980s births
Living people
American political journalists
Former Latter Day Saints
Harvard Kennedy School alumni
Brigham Young University alumni
Competitive Enterprise Institute
Converts to Anglicanism from Mormonism
21st-century American Episcopalians